The GoldSpirit Awards, yearly granted through the website BSOSpirit, are devoted to soundtracks and film music fans.

BSOSpirit was released on 2001, as a Spanish website relating soundtracks and film music. Attempting to emphasize and recognize the role of the music in movies (contrary to other awards), since 2002, visitors can vote for their favorite scores and composers of the last year for the GoldSpirit Awards.

The name GoldSpirit comes from the contraction of Goldsmith (for the late composer Jerry Goldsmith, an homage to his figure) and Spirit (for BSOSpirit). BSO stands for Banda Sonora Original (in English, Original Soundtrack, OST).

Categories
The list of categories in the GoldSpirit Awards is the following:
Best Song
Most Deceiving OST
Best Edition/Re-edition of an OST from the Past
Best Song Album
Best Unreleased Score
Best Record Label
Best Horror Theme/Cue
Best Drama Theme/Cue
Best Action Theme/Cue
Best Comedy Theme/Cue
Best Epic Theme/Cue
Best Romantic Theme/Cue
Best Theme/Cue
Best Score in Other Media (Videogames, TV, Documentary)
Best Horror Score
Best Drama Score
Best Adventure/Action/Thriller Score
Best Comedy Score
Best Animation Score
Best Fantasy/Sci-fi Score
Best Spanish Score
Most Revealing Newcomer
Best Spanish Composer
Best Composer
Best Score

Also, since 2005, the winners are awarded in a special ceremony included as part of the International Conference on Film Music 'City of Úbeda', located by the end of July at Úbeda (Jaén, Spain).

External links
Cinezik.fr 8e Goldspirit Awards, Ubeda 2009 - Palmarès !
BSOSpirit - Spanish website about soundtracks and film music
International Conference on Film Music 'City of Ubeda' - Official website

American film awards